Lometa Independent School District is a public school district based in Lometa, Texas (USA).

Located in Lampasas County, a small portion of the district extends into Mills County.

Lometa ISD has one school that serves students in grades pre-kindergarten through twelve.

Academic achievement
In 2009, the school district was rated "academically acceptable" by the Texas Education Agency.

Special programs

Athletics
Lometa High School plays six-man football.

See also

List of school districts in Texas

References

External links
Lometa ISD

School districts in Lampasas County, Texas
School districts in Mills County, Texas